Sílvia Cartaña Ortega (Barcelona, March 8, 1963), better known as Sílvia Marsó is a Spanish film, stage and television actress and theatre producer. She started her career in the Televisión Española's game show Un, dos, tres... responda otra vez.

Television
 1981: Gent d, aquí (TVE Cataluña).
 1983/1984: Un, dos, tres... responda otra vez (TVE). 
 1984/1985: Y sin embargo...te quiero (TVE).
 1985: Los sabios (TVE).
 1985: La Comedia Musical Española "Las leandras", "El sobre verde" (TVE).
 1986: Harem (BBC).
1986: Segunda enseñanza (TVE).
1986: Turno de oficio (TVE).
 1987: Un, dos, tres... responda otra vez (TVE).
 1987: La voz humana "Avecilla" (TVE).
 1989: Primera función "Ocho mujeres" (TVE).
 1990/1991: Telecupón (Telecinco).
 1993: Farmacia de guardia (Antena 3).
 1993: Los ladrones van a la oficina (Antena 3).
 1994/1995: Canguros (Antena 3).
 1995: Mar de dudas (TVE).
 1997: Pasen y vean "Sublime decisión", "Julieta tiene un desliz" (Telecinco).
 1997: La banda de Perez (TVE).
 1998: Manos a la obra (Antena 3).
 2001: 7 vidas (Telecinco).
 2008: El porvenir es largo (TVE).
 2020: El secreto de Puente Viejo (Antena 3)

Filmography
 1985: El donante, by Tito Fernández.
 1994: La madre muerta, by Juanma Bajo Ulloa.
 2001: Amor, curiosidad, prozak y dudas, by Miguel Santesmases
 2002: Nosotras, by Judith Colell
 2005: Cuadrilátero, by José Carlos Ruíz
 2007: Ángeles S.A. by Eduard Bosch, with María Isabel, Pablo Carbonell and Anabel Alonso
 2007: Freedomless, by Xoel Pamos
 2007: Myway, by Toni Salgot
 2008: Pájaros muertos, by Guillermo and Jorge Sempere

Theatre  
 1989: Lend Me a Tenor (Búscame un tenor) by Ken Ludwig, directed by Alexander Herold.
 1989: La Folle de Chaillot (La loca de Chaillot) by Jean Giraudoux, directed by José Luis Alonso.
 1991: Hecuba by Euripides, directed by Emilio Hernández.
 1991: The Lady of the Dawn (La dama del alba) by Alejandro Casona, directed by Juan Carlos Pérez de la Fuente.
 1992: La Gran Sultana by  Miguel de Cervantes, directed by Adolfo Marsillach.
 1995: Three Tall Women (Tres mujeres altas) by Edward Albee directed by Jaime Chávarri.
 1998: Doña Rosita the Spinster (|Doña Rosita la soltera) by Federico García Lorca, directed by José Tamayo.
 2000: I Love You, You're Perfect, Now Change (Te quiero, eres perfecto... ya te cambiaré) by Joe DiPietro and Jimmy Roberts, directed by Esteve Ferrer.
 2005: Can't Pay? Won't Pay! (Aquí no paga nadie) by Dario Fo, directed by Esteve Ferrer.
 2006: Life x 3 (Tres versiones de la vida) by Yasmina Reza, directed by Natalia Menéndez.
 2010: House of Dolls by Henrik Ibsen, directed by Amelia Ochandiano.
 2012: Yerma by Federico García Lorca, directed by Miguel Narros.
 2013: Capitalismo, hazles reír by Juan Cavestany, directed by Andrés Lima.
 2014: The Glass Menagerie (El zoo de cristal) by Tennessee Williams, directed by Francisco Vidal.
 2016: La puerta de al lado by Fabrice Roger Lacan, directed by Sergio Peris-Mencheta.
 2017: Twenty-Four Hours in the Life of a Woman (24 horas en la vida de una mujer'') by Stefan Zweig directed by Ignacio García.

References

External links

1963 births
Living people
20th-century Spanish actresses
Spanish film actresses
Spanish television actresses
Spanish stage actresses
Actresses from Barcelona
21st-century Spanish actresses